Space advertising is the practice of advertising in outer space. This is usually done using product placement during manned space missions.

Obtrusive space advertising is advertising in outer space that is capable of being recognized by a human being on the surface of the Earth without the aid of a telescope or other technological device and non-obtrusive space advertising is the term for any other type of advertisements in space such as logos on space suits, satellites, and rockets. 

Since advertising in space could be a cause of space debris as well as obscuring the view of space as seen from the ground, it is regulated by international and national legislations. But while space advertising is limited by both contemporary regulation and technological capability, in popular culture, space advertising has taken a variety of forms and displays.

History 
After the Space Race and the fall of the Soviet Union, space advertising became a point of interest for various organizations. There have been numerous attempts at space advertising since then, such as Elon Musk’s SpaceX launch of a Tesla car into orbit.

A major advantage of space advertising over other Earth-bound methods is the sheer scale of reach. Millions of people across multiple countries can be exposed to an advert orbiting Earth. As such, space advertising can provide valuable advertising capabilities, though relatively high start-up costs have prohibited this from becoming a commonplace mode of advertisement.

Attempts 
The high cost of orbital spaceflight (millions per launch) has discouraged attempts in the past. Public space exploration authorities have also been reluctant to cater to advertisers. For example, NASA's restrictive policy on its employees' endorsing of products required astronauts to refer to M&M's as "candy-coated" chocolates.

Successful attempts 

Due to the high cost of orbital launches as well as the associated maintenance costs, there have not been many successful advertising projects. For context, SpaceX's base fares for sending objects into space are in the millions.

Some of the successful attempts include:

Tokyo Broadcasting System (1990) - The Tokyo Broadcasting System (TBS) paid approximately $11 million to the Russian space agency for the flight of journalist Toyohiro Akiyama to the Russian space station Mir. The launch vehicle displayed the Tokyo Broadcasting System logo.
Pepsi (1996) - Paid approximately $5 million to have a cosmonaut float a replica of the company's soda can outside the Russian space station.
Tnuva (1997) - Israeli milk company Tnuva filmed a commercial for their product on former Russian space station Mir. This commercial aired in August 1997 and holds the Guinness World Record for the first advertisement shot in space.
Pizza Hut (2000) - In 2000 Pizza Hut paid approximately $1 million to have the company logo on a Proton rocket launched to the International Space Station by Russia. In 2001, Pizza Hut delivered a 6-inch salami pizza to the International Space Station.
Nissin Foods (2005) - Sent vacuum-sealed Cup Noodles to space that were eaten by cosmonaut Sergei Krikalev for a TV commercial. 
Element 21 (2006) - Russian cosmonaut Mikhail Tyurin hit a golf ball from the ISS porch as part of a commercial with Element 21.
Toshiba Space Chair Project (2009) - Toshiba used helium balloons to bring four empty chairs to the edge of space and filmed a TV commercial for their Regza HD TVs.
Lowe's & Made In Space 3D Printer (2016) - Sent a 3D printer to the International Space Station. 
KFC (2017) - Launched the Zinger-1 mission, sending a KFC Zinger Sandwich to the edge of space. This mission was a test flight for World View Enterprises' Satellite high-altitude balloons.
SpaceX (2018) - Sent a Tesla Roadster into orbit as the dummy payload for Falcon Heavy test flight.
Vegemite (2019) - A group of university students from University of Technology Sydney launched two pieces of Vegemite toast on a stratospheric balloon from the Hunter Valley region, north of Sydney.
Rocket Lab (2019) - Sent a reflective sphere, the Humanity Star, into orbit.

Failed attempts 
Although the number of attempts at space advertising is small, there have been several notable failed attempts as companies and organizations around the world planned different projects to launch some type of marketing ploy into space.

Some of the failed attempts that have occurred in the past include:

 France's “Ring of Light” Project (1989) - This project was intended as a tribute to the 100th anniversary of the building of the Eiffel Tower. Involved the launch of a ring of 100 reflectors that would link together, reflecting the sun's light to become visible for about 10 minutes out of every 90-minute orbital period. It was ultimately called off due to concern that it could interfere with space-related scientific research and widespread criticism.
 Russian Space Program (1990s) - Russian space program that involved the launch of satellites designed to reflect and beam sunlight to polar regions on Earth.
 Space Marketing Inc. (1993) -  Proposed launching a billboard into space. Was ultimately blocked by House of Representatives members passing legislation to prevent the issue of launch licenses for the purpose of putting advertisements in space.
PepsiCo Billboard (2019) - The Russian branch of PepsiCo Inc. partnered with Russian startup StartRocket for the attempted creation of an orbital billboard. There was a successful exploratory test of orbital advertisements, however this attempt was ultimately stopped when the plan was denied by PepsiCo's U.S. Branch.

Challenges

Regulation 
One of the challenges of obtrusive space advertising is the difference in marketing regulations across different countries. Because obtrusive space advertisements orbit the earth, they are seen in the sky in multiple different countries. In the EU, advertisers are banned from running tobacco or alcohol related advertisements. In Ireland, advertisements that undermine public authority are also outlawed. Countries like the United States on the other hand prioritize freedom of commercial speech. These differences in advertising regulations make it harder for obtrusive space advertisements to remain legal across multiple jurisdictions.

In the United States, consumers have the right to deny the receipt of advertisement. It is not clear whether or not consumers can effectively opt out of receiving space advertisements. Consumers might have to close their blinds, doors, or not look into the sky to not view space advertisements.

Infringements on property rights also create a challenge for space advertisers. Since space advertisements could be bright lit, it might create nuisance for property owners. Bright objects in the sky might interfere with sleep cycles for some property owners.

Astronomical observations 
The International Astronomical Union argues that artificial satellites built out of reflective material adversely impact astronomical observations. Obtrusive space advertisements that are comparable to the brightness of the moon have the potential to make the observation of faint distant objects impossible from the surface of the earth.

Space debris 
Anything that is launched into orbit generally remains in orbit. Space objects that have surpassed their functional use period not equipped with deorbiting technology are considered space debris. Space debris can lead to collisions with other space objects which can contribute to a cascading increase in space debris known as the Kessler syndrome. Increasing amounts of space debris can make space exploration and utilization of LEO more difficult.

Space advertisers could face penalties if the advertisements are considered to eventually become space debris. Because objects in orbit can remain in orbit for long periods of time, it is possible that the object remains in orbit longer than the advertising entity still exists. If approved, obtrusive space advertisers can expect to comply with end-of-life deorbiting measures and anti-collision measures.

Regulations 
While space advertising is a relatively new concept, it is subject to a some international treaties and national policies either specifically on space advertising or space commercial activities.

For obtrusive advertising 

 UN treaties
 Outer Space Treaty (1966) sets principles of international space law. It determines that all States should have the right to freely explore the outer space. This treaty provides free access to space so space advertising is not subject to global prohibition.
 Space Liability Convention (1972) rules that a State is fully liable for damages caused by space objects launched in its territory. Under this treaty, States are responsible for private launches for commercial purposes, including advertising.

 The United States
 51 U.S. Code 50911 regulates that no license will be issued and no launch will be permitted for activities that involve obtrusive space advertising. This prohibition does not apply to other forms of advertising, such as displaying logos. The display of logos is allowed in both launches with commercial licenses and launches with experiment permits.

 Other nations
 In November 2016, Japan legislated a licensing system for private-sector companies' launching. This act aims to stimulate Japanese's commercial activities in space by supporting third-party liability insurance as well as channeling more liability onto launching companies to assure customers who pay the launchers.
 Russia prohibits launches which contaminate the outer space and create unfavorable environmental changes. However, there is no explicit ban on space advertising despite the light pollution and debris it potentially creates.

For non-obtrusive advertising 

 The United States
 Public law 106-391 does not apply to non-obtrusive commercial space advertising including commercial space transportation vehicles, space infrastructure payloads, space launch facilities, launch support facilities.
 NASA (National Aeronautics and Space Administration) does not permit use of the NASA Insignia and other NASA indicia in advertisements. However, It is discussing on loosening its commercial restriction policy as a governmental agency. It is considering to sell the naming rights of its spacecraft for financial purposes. Loosening such restrictions might cause more brands to conduct space advertising.
 NASA support in filming/capturing commercials or other marketing videos. In 2019, NASA opened International Space Station (ISS) for space advertising and other short-duration commercial activities conducted by private companies' crews.
 Other nations
 No other nation has legislative regulations on non-obtrusive space advertising explicitly. The non-obtrusive advertising of the states’ own entities and private corporate entities is less problematic in national and international laws compared to obtrusive space advertising.

Criticism

Obstacles 
There is also growing concern about the dangers that can be caused by launching more objects - including advertisements - in space.  Placing more satellites in space could increase opportunities for satellite collisions, as stated by John Crassidis, a professor of mechanical and aerospace engineering at the University at Buffalo.  He believes that the biggest issue will be how the additional satellites can potentially become space debris.  An implication of the additional advertising satellites in space could contribute to the Kessler syndrome. Many other incidents of space collisions have occurred:

 French satellite collision (1996) - First verified case of collision between artificial space objects that further contributed to space debris.
 China's anti-satellite test (2007) - Contributed to more than 3,000 pieces of space debris.
Russian satellite (2009) - A Russian satellite that was no longer functioning collided with a functioning U.S. Iridium commercial satellite and contributed to more than 2,000 additional pieces of space debris.

Pollution 

Aside from the danger that can be brought about with increasing space advertising, pollution is also another problem. A paper that was presented to the United Nations by International Astronomical Union stated that "Scattered light from sunlit spacecraft and space debris, and radio noise from communications satellites and global positioning systems in space, reach the entire surface of the Earth”. Furthermore, there is currently no international consensus on the best way to remove the space debris since space in the international territory and so the increase in space debris will also make space even more impenetrable because of the increased likelihood of collision which can deter future space missions.

In popular culture 

Advertising in outer space or space flight has been featured in several science fiction books, films, video games, and television series, and frequently in the animated series Futurama. They are usually shown as a satire of commercialization.

Film 

 In the 2008 computer-animated science fiction film WALL-E, the star liner spacecraft Axiom features a wide variety of advertisements for Buy n Large products.
In the 2008 film Hancock, the logo of the fictitious All-Heart charity is painted on the Moon by the title character.

Literature 

 In Fredric Brown's 1945 short story, "Pi in the Sky," an inventor rearranges the apparent positions of the stars to form an advertising slogan.
 In Robert A. Heinlein's 1951 novella The Man Who Sold the Moon, the protagonist raises funds for his lunar ambitions by publicly describing means of covering the visible lunar face in advertising and propaganda, and then taking money not to do so.
 In Arthur C. Clarke's 1956 set of linked stories Venture to the Moon, within the story Watch this space, a sodium cannon is modified by one of the party - and as the narrator notes, with great financial inducement and reward - to modify the exit nozzle of the cannon to paint the non-illuminated portion of the Moon visible from Earth with the logo of a soft-drinks company as the sodium atoms enter the sunlight, and glow in contrast to the darker Moon surface below as they escape into space. While the story implies that this company may be Coca-Cola, there is sufficient ambiguity that this company may also have been Pepsi, or another unnamed corporation.
 In Isaac Asimov's 1958 short story "Buy Jupiter", a group of extraterrestrials broker a deal with the governments of Earth to purchase the planet Jupiter for use as an advertisement platform to passing starships from their worlds.
 In Franquin's 1961 comics album, Z comme Zorglub, Zorglub attempts to write an advertisement for Coca-Cola on the Moon.
 A Red Dwarf novel features an advertising campaign whereby a ship is sent on a mission by The Coca-Cola Company to cause 128 stars to go supernova in order to visibly spell the words "Coke Adds Life!" across the sky on Earth. The message is intended to last five weeks, and be visible even in daylight.

References

External links 

 Photos and Logotypes to be sent into space on TechCrunch

Advertising, space
Advertising by medium
Advertising